Glen Travis Campbell is the eponymous seventeenth studio album by American country music artist Glen Campbell, released in 1972 through Capitol Records. Recorded in Hollywood, and produced by Jimmy Bowen, the album's title refers to his full name.

The singles "I Will Never Pass This Way Again" and "One Last Time" (written by the Addrisi Brothers) reached 61 and 78 respectively on the Billboard 100 pop chart.

Track listing
Side 1:

 "I Will Never Pass This Way Again" (Ronnie Gaylord) – 2:41
 "One Last Time" (Don Addrisi, Dick Addrisi) – 3:14
 "Sweet Fantasy" (Hoyt Axton) – 2:54
 "She Thinks I Still Care" (Dickey Lee) – 3:07
 "Running Scared" (Roy Orbison, Joe Melson) – 2:24

Side 2:

 "Someone to Give My Love To" (Jerry Foster, Bill Rice) – 2:57
 "All My Tomorrows" (Sammy Cahn, Jimmy Van Heusen) – 3:15
 "My Cricket" (Leon Russell) – 2:33
 "Just for What I Am" (Dallas Frazier, A. L. Owens) – 3:20
 "The Last Thing on My Mind" (Tom Paxton) – 3:54

Personnel
Glen Campbell – vocals, acoustic guitar
Larry Muhoberac – keyboards
Dennis McCarthy – piano

Production
Producer – Jimmy Bowen
Arranged by Larry Muhoberac
"I Will Never Pass This Way Again", "Just For What I Am" arranged by Dennis McCarthy
"Sweet Fantasy" arranged by Glen Campbell
Engineers – John Guess, Ed Flaherty
Art direction – John Hoernie
Design – Roy Kohara
Photography – Don Peterson

Charts
Album – Billboard (United States)

Singles – Billboard (United States)

Glen Campbell albums
1972 albums
Capitol Records albums
Albums arranged by Larry Muhoberac
Albums produced by Jimmy Bowen
Albums recorded at Capitol Studios